Mahmoud Hemida (Arabic: محمود حميدة; born December 7, 1953, in Cairo) is an Egyptian actor and producer.

Career
Mahmoud's acting career began with performances on television in 1986, he received his first starring role in a TV series by the director Ahmed Khadr, where his performance had been impressed by those working and interested in the film industry in Egypt.. Then he participated in the series (Harat Al Shurafa) and (Al Wassiyah) and (Abyad W Eswed) alongside movie star Salah Zulfikar in 1989, his performance in that last series drew a lot of praise and acclaim for his talents and marked the beginning of his rise as a star.

The start of Mahmoud's cinematic career began with his performing a leading role alongside Ahmed Zaki in the film (Al Embrator) in 1990. Mahmoud has also founded a production company that has released several films including “Janat Al Shayytan”.

Mahmoud founded an (entertainment) magazine titled “Al Fann Al Sabeaa” which was the first Arabic, cinematic, printed magazine to be specialized in the Cinema industry in the Middle East.

In 1996, he founded a production company Albatrik, for Artistic productions and cinematic services which produced some of under its own banner, and some of them as the executive producer for other companies. Their most successful movie under their banner was “Janet El shyateen”, which appreciated by the Critics. In the same year, he established "El-Momthel" Studio with the help of professionals for training and supporting the new talents

Filmography

Films

TV serials 
The GodFather: 2017 - Zain Al Attar
Inheritance of the Wind: 2013 - Ibrahim Tayeb
Song on the Bridge Of Hope
Medal: 1990 - Khawaja Taki
Black and white: 1989
Five m Five m: 1987
Al-Shorafa Lane: 1986
Al - Azhar Al - Sharif Lighthouse of Islam: 1982 - Bilal
Ahmed bin Majid: 1980 - his first role
But love: Dr Alaa Tambouli
Man and train
Exit the circle

Awards

References

External links

Egyptian male film actors
Egyptian producers
1953 births
Living people
Egyptian male television actors
People from Giza